Jiří Svoboda may refer to:

Jiří Svoboda (athlete) (1903–1937), Czech Olympic athlete
Jiří Svoboda (volleyball) (born 1941), Czech former volleyball player
Jiří Svoboda (director) (born 1945), Czech TV- and movie director and chairman of the Communist Party of Bohemia and Moravia during the years 1990–1993
Jiří Svoboda (canoeist) (born 1954), Czechoslovak sprint canoeist
Jiří Svoboda (architect) (born 1961), Czech architect, artist, and teacher